Ornativalva triangulella is a moth of the family Gelechiidae. It was described by Sattler in 1967. It is found in Algeria, Tunisia, Kuwait, Iraq, south-eastern Iran (Baluchistan) and Afghanistan.

Adults have been recorded on wing from March to May and in October.

References

Moths described in 1967
Ornativalva